The common name anemone crab may refer to any of the following species:
Neopetrolisthes ohshimai, a north-west Pacific porcelain crab (Porcellanidae)
Mithraculus cinctimanus, a Caribbean spider crab (Majidae)
Lybia spp.

Animal common name disambiguation pages